Emmanuel Gaëtan Nguemkam Monthé (born 26 January 1995) is a Cameroonian footballer who plays for  club Walsall

Career
Monthé was a youth player at Queens Park Rangers before signing a professional contract for the 2013–14 season. He was loaned to Southport in March 2014. He made seven appearances before returning to the Rs where he was released at the end of the season.

He joined Bath City for 2016–17 season, After an impressive 5 months in his performances scoring 4 goals in 19 appearances Monthé was signed by Forest Green Rovers in November 2016 agreeing a two and a half year contract for an undisclosed fee. Monthé was part of the Forest Green side that were victorious in the National League play-offs at the end of the season which saw the club promoted to the EFL for the first time in its history. He made his English Football League debut against Barnet on 5 August 2017. In February 2018 he joined Tranmere Rovers on loan which Monthé gained a second promotion in the National League (English football) The loan was made permanent at the end of the season for an undisclosed fee.

Tranmere Rovers

On 26 June 2018, Monthé signed to Tranmere Rovers F.C. after an impressive loan spell on for an undisclosed fee agreeing a one year contract. The left footed centre-back made 43 league starts appearances scoring 2 goals during 2018–19 EFL League Two in total over 50 starts in all competition season securing a third promotion to League One in 2019 EFL League Two play-off Final.

On 11 June 2019 after a momentous season, Manny Monthé signed a new two-year contract with Tranmere Rovers F.C. The 24-year-old dominant centre back, who won the Club's Young Player of the season, had been instrumental in helping the Rovers secure back-to-back promotion to the 2019–20 EFL League One. Monthé turned down interest from numerous clubs to remain at Prenton Park. During the 2019–20 EFL League One season Monthé made 31 league starts scoring 1 goal, being involved in Tranmere's 2019–20 FA Cup run scoring two goals in the third round tie against Watford F.C. setting up a fourth round tie and losing against Manchester United F.C. 

During 2019-2020 season with new variant of Covid-19 Tranmere Rovers F.C. were regulated to League Two by PPG. Monthé went on to impress and make over 40 appearances for Tranmere Rovers F.C. in 2020–21 EFL League Two season which concluded in defeat in the EFL League Two play-offs to Morecambe F.C.

Walsall

On 14 June 2021, Monthé agreed a deal to join Walsall, signing a two-year contract.

Career statistics

Honours
Forest Green Rovers
National League play-offs: 2017

Tranmere Rovers
National League play-offs: 2018
EFL League Two play-offs: 2019
EFL Trophy runner-up: 2020–21

References

External links

1995 births
Living people
Cameroonian footballers
Association football defenders
Queens Park Rangers F.C. players
Southport F.C. players
Bath City F.C. players
Forest Green Rovers F.C. players
Tranmere Rovers F.C. players
Walsall F.C. players
English Football League players
National League (English football) players